Agabus klamathensis is a species of predacious diving beetle belonging to the family Dytiscidae. This species is found in springs, creeks, rivers, and pools in northern California and southwestern Oregon.

Agabus klamathensis is named for Klamath County, Oregon, where the type specimen was collected.

References

Beetles of North America
Beetles described in 1989
klamathensis